Hugo Ollas is a Swedish ice hockey goaltender who plays for the Merrimack Warriors. He played in two games for Linköping HC of the SHL in the 2020–21 season. Ollas was drafted by the New York Rangers of the National Hockey League in the seventh round of the 2020 NHL Entry Draft with the 197th overall pick.

At 6 feet, 8 inches tall, Ollas is larger than most goaltenders.  Going into the 2020 draft, he was taller than any goaltender playing in the NHL.  He was considered by The Hockey Writers to be "a rough goalie prospect with an incredibly high ceiling.

Ollas was named the Hockey East goaltender of the month for November 2022 after posting 96 saves for a .960 saves percentage for Merrimack.

References

External links

2002 births
Living people
Swedish ice hockey goaltenders
Linköping HC players
New York Rangers draft picks
Sportspeople from Linköping
Merrimack Warriors men's ice hockey players
Sportspeople from Östergötland County